Homeobox protein TGIF1 is a protein that, in humans, is encoded by the TGIF1 gene. Alternative splicing has been observed at this locus and eight variants, encoding four distinct isoforms, are described.

Function 

The protein encoded by this gene is a member of the three-amino acid loop extension (TALE) superclass of atypical homeodomains. TALE homeobox proteins are highly conserved transcription regulators. This particular homeodomain binds to a previously characterized retinoid X receptor responsive element from the cellular retinol-binding protein II promoter. In addition to its role in inhibiting 9-cis-retinoic acid-dependent RXR alpha transcription activation of the retinoic acid responsive element, the protein is an active transcriptional co-repressor of SMAD2 and may participate in the transmission of nuclear signals during development and in the adult.

Clinical significance 

Mutations in this gene are associated with holoprosencephaly type 4, which is a structural anomaly of the brain.  It has also been associated with risk of otitis media (inflammation of the middle ear)

Interactions 

Homeobox protein TGIF1 has been shown to interact with:
 C-jun, 
 CTBP1, 
 HDAC1,  and
 Mothers against decapentaplegic homolog 2.

References

Further reading